Evje og Hornnes is a municipality in Agder county, Norway. It is located in the traditional district of Setesdal. The administrative centre of the municipality is the village of Evje. Other villages in the municipality include Åneland, Dåsnesmoen, Flatebygd, Gautestad, Hornnes, Kjetså, and Øvre Dåsvatn. Evje og Hornnes was created as a new municipality on 1 January 1960 after the merger of the two older municipalities of Evje and Hornnes. The Norwegian National Road 9 runs north–south through the municipality, along the river Otra.

The  municipality is the 191st largest by area out of the 356 municipalities in Norway. Evje og Hornnes is the 210th most populous municipality in Norway with a population of 3,653.

General information

During the 1960s, Norway enacted many municipal reforms such as mergers and border adjustments due to the work of the Schei Committee, and the municipality of Evje og Hornnes was established during this time. On 1 January 1960, the neighboring municipalities of Evje (population: 1,646) and Hornnes (population: 1,280) were merged to form Evje og Hornnes. On 1 January 1986, the Lislevand farm area (population: 8) was transferred from neighboring Birkenes municipality to Evje og Hornnes.  On 1 January 2019, the Hovlandsdalen area (population: 27) was transferred from neighboring Birkenes municipality to Evje og Hornnes.

Name
The municipalities of Evje and Hornnes were joined in 1960 with the compound name Evje og Hornnes, literally "Evje and Hornnes".

The municipality (originally the parish) of Evje is named after an old Evje farm, since the first Evje Church was built there. The name is identical with the word efja, which means "eddy", possibly referring to the nearby river Otra.

The municipality (originally the parish) of Hornnes is named after an old Hornnes farm, since the first Hornnes Church was built there. The first element is horn, which means "horn", and the last element is nes, which means "headland". So the meaning of Hornnes is "the headland shaped like a horn". This is likely referring to the two horn-shaped peninsulas that jut out into the river Otra at the entrance to the lake Breidflå.

Coat of arms
The coat of arms was granted on 24 April 1992. The official blazon is "Or, two wagons sable in pale". This means the arms have a charge that is two black mining wagons in the centre, one above the other. The field (background) of the arms have a tincture of Or which means it is commonly colored yellow, but if it is made out of metal, then gold is used. The arms were chosen because mining has been of great importance for the area already for many centuries. One of Europe's largest nickel mines is in the municipality. There are two wagons to represent the fact that the municipality was created from two former municipalities: Evje and Hornnes. The arms were designed by Daniel Rike.

Churches
The Church of Norway has two parishes within the municipality of Evje og Hornnes. It is part of the Otredal prosti (deanery) in the Diocese of Agder og Telemark.

History
The Flåt mine in Evje og Hornnes municipality was Europe's largest nickel mine for a period. Flåt mine came into operation in 1844 as a copper mine. From 1872 until 1946 it was mined for nickel. Local mining technology and mine history can be seen at the museum at Fennefoss, just outside of the village of Evje.

Evjemoen was a Norwegian military camp in use from 1912 to 2002. The camp lies south of Evje, on the eastern shore of the river Otra. From 1953 to 1995, Evjemoen was used as a training area for Infanteriets øvingsavdeling II (IØ2). The camp was retired in December 2002.

Geography
Evje og Hornnes is bordered by the municipalities of Bygland and Froland to the northeast and by Birkenes and Iveland to the southeast. To the west it is bounded by Åseral and Lyngdal and to the south by Lindesnes and Vennesla municipalities.

The Otra river which flows through Evje og Hornnes is the largest river in the Sørlandet district. It flows from the Setesdalsheiene mountains to the north in Bykle municipality down to the municipality of Kristiansand in the south. The lake Kilefjorden is part of the Otra river, along the southern part of the municipality.

The lake Gyvatn is located along the border with Bygland and Åseral. The lake Byglandsfjorden has its southernmost point in the northern part of the municipality.

Government
All municipalities in Norway, including Evje og Hornnes, are responsible for primary education (through 10th grade), outpatient health services, senior-citizen services, unemployment and other social services, zoning, economic development, and municipal roads. The municipality is governed by a municipal council of elected representatives, which in turn elect a mayor.  The municipality falls under the Agder District Court and the Agder Court of Appeal.

Municipal council
The municipal council of Evje og Hornnes is made up of 21 representatives, which are elected to every 4 years. Currently, the party breakdown is as follows:

Geology
The Evje og Hornnes municipality is situated at the southwestern margin of the Baltic Shield, the exposed section of the East European craton. Rocks in the area are dominated by different types of precambrian gneis and a large metagabbro body stretching into the neighboring Iveland municipality.

During the final stages of Sveconorwegian (0.9–1.1 gigaannum) orogeny, a large pluton of granitic/monzonitic composition was emplaced in the northern part of the municipality and is assumed to have a relationship with the thousands of pegmatite veins in the Evje-Iveland area.

Earlier during the Sveconorwegian orogeny, mafic rocks (gabbro-diorite) were emplaced. Most of the gabbro has been affected by the Sveconorwegian orogeny and became a metagabbro (amfibolite) with only minor remnants of the original gabbro. The Flåt Nickel Mine is situated at the north-western margin in a diorite intrusion post-dating the gabbro.

The pegmatites of the Evje-Iveland area have become worldwide known for a large number of rare and often crystallized minerals.

The pegmatites were initially mined for quartz, used in the melter at Fennefoss to extract the nickel from the ore from the Flåt Nickel Mine. Later, large quantities of feldspar were mined for use in the ceramic industry, both in Norway and abroad. Also mica (muscovite), beryl, rare-earth minerals, scandium ore, and minor quantities of uranium ore were mined.

After 1983, almost all mines were abandoned, and nowadays only minor quantities of "tannspat" or dentalspat are mined in a couple of mines. This is microcline or plagioclase feldspar of very high purity and used to make porcelain teeth-fillings or dentures. The tannspat is exported to Germany, Liechtenstein, Austria, and sometimes Japan.

A number of the mines is still open to mineral collectors.

Economy
The area is internationally known for its geology and its mineral richness. Deposits of nickel, quartz, feldspar, mica, beryl, REE minerals, scandium, and uranium ore have been exploited. Nowadays only ultra-pure feldspar for dental applications is being mined.

Tourism is a major source of income for the entire area. During the summer, many thousands of tourist visit Evje. Outdoor activities in the area include rafting, rock climbing, biking, cross-country skiing, kayaking, canoeing, paddling, water skiing, riverboarding, swimming, fishing, mineral collecting, and mine excursions. Additionally, there are several museums and farms open to visitors.

The shopping center of Evje is of regional importance. In addition, there is some industry in Evje. One such industry is Skibsplast, a producer of fiberglass boats.

Attractions

Geology

Evje og Hornnes geomuseum Fennefoss
The Setesdal museum manages the Evje og Hornnes Geomuseum Fennesfoss, which is based out of Rysstad in Valle municipality. The geomuseum has an extensive collection of local minerals, most notably minerals from the pegmatite veins in the Evje-Iveland district. These pegmatites have been exploited for quartz, feldspar, mica, beryl, thortveitite, REE-containing minerals and uraninite. In addition, gemstone material has been found: aquamarine, golden beryl, rock crystal, smoky quartz, citrine, spessartine and amazonite. The geomuseum has samples of all these minerals. Marie Curie had several consignments of radioactive minerals sent to her from this region. The museum includes a collection of laboratory equipment, among which an electroscope with "Pierre Curie" engraved.

Mineralparken
The displays are entirely constructed in underground mining adits. The collection consists of more than 1000 foreign and Norwegian minerals. The Setesdal Mineralpark is internationally acclaimed to be a unique museum, with a collection of very high quality. The outside area is an activity park for children.

Flåt nickel mine (Flåt nikkelgruve)
The Flåt nickel mine was in operation 1872–1946, and was once Europe's largest in its kind. Most of the mining buildings have been torn down, but the area has been developed as a tourist attraction with many sign posts explaining what once has been at the different localtions.

Evje mineral trail (Evje Mineralsti)
It is possible to find samples of many types of minerals such as amazonite, different types of quartz, fluorite, pyrite and many others. It is also possible to find samples of the pegmatite rock, with feldspar/quartz/mica. The first mine, Landsverk I, is also the most mineral-rich pegmatite of the entire Evje-Iveland district.

Oddestemmen steinsliperi
The Oddestemmen Steinsliperi is probably the only remaining historic stone-cutter workshop left in Norway. The workshop specializes in the cabochon technique and produces silver jewelry with stones from own production.

Mineral tourism
The Evje-Iveland area is famous for its mineral richness. Several of the old pegmatite mines in the area are open to collectors. During the 2021 season the following mines are open: Knipane, Solås, Steli (all in Iveland), and Evje Mineralsti (in Evje).

Otra
The Otra river is the largest river in the south of Norway. It springs from the Setesdalsheiene in Bykle municipality and runs southwards to Kristiansand, where it runs out in the sea. The Otra is known for salmon fishing and is known for a rare salmon variety, the "bleka" or "bleke". The Otra is extensively used for outdoor activities, like rafting, paddling, swimming and fishing.

Notable people 
 Jørgen Løvland (1848 in Evje – 1922) an educator and Prime Minister of Norway 1907 to 1908
 Torleiv Hannaas (1874 in Hornnes – 1929) a Norwegian philologist and academic 
 Torvald Haavardstad (1893 in Evje – 1965) school teacher, church singer; long-time Mayor of Evje
 Geir Kjetsaa (1937–2008) a professor in Russian literary history, grew up and died in Hornnes
 Per Sefland (born 1949 in Evje) served in various Police roles & Governor of Svalbard
 Helena Iren Michaelsen (born 1977 in Evje) a singer-songwriter with symphonic metal band Imperia

References

External links

Evje og Hornnes www.visitnorway.com 
Municipal fact sheet from Statistics Norway 
 
Municipal website 
Setesdal.com 
Kultur i Evje og Hornnes på kart (map) 
Evje og Hornnes Geomuseum på Fennefoss 
Iveland Kommunehus 
Setesdal Mineralpark 

 
Municipalities of Agder
1960 establishments in Norway
Setesdal